The Chikokon Range is a mountain range in the Transbaikal Region (Zabaykalsky Krai) of Siberia, Russia. The range is named after the Chikokon River, a small left tributary of the Chikoy River. 

The Chikokon Range is within the limits of the Trans-Baikal conifer forests ecoregion. The Chikoy National Park is located in the area of the range.

Geography
The Chikokon Range is part of the Khentei-Daur Highlands, South Siberian System. It rises in the interfluve of the Chikoy River, a right tributary of the Selenga, and some tributaries of the Onon River. The southern part of the ridge acts as watershed between the Arctic and Pacific oceans. The relief is characterized by steep slopes. Traces of Pleistocene glaciation in the form of sediments are present in certain places of the range.

Spurs extending from the Chikokon Range connect with the Pereval and Burkal ranges.

Flora
The slopes of the range are mainly covered with mountain taiga and pre-Alpine forest. The higher parts are topped by "golets" type bare summits.

See also
Chikoy National Park

References

Mountain ranges of Russia
Khentei-Daur Highlands